J. Jerome Hahn (August 20, 1868 – December 6, 1938) was a justice of the Rhode Island Supreme Court from 1931 to 1935.

Born in Albany, New York, Hahn received an LL.B. from Boston University School of Law in 1889. He moved to Providence, Rhode Island, where he entered the practice of law and became "especially noted as an authority on the bankruptcy laws". He was appointed to a seat on the Rhode Island Superior Court in 1919, and elevated to the state supreme court in 1931, to a seat vacated by the death of Chester W. Barrows.

Hahn died at his home in Providence at the age of 70, "after a sickness of several weeks".

References

1868 births
1938 deaths
People from Albany, New York
Boston University School of Law alumni
Justices of the Rhode Island Supreme Court